Courage Under Fire is a 1996 American war film directed by Edward Zwick, and starring Denzel Washington and Meg Ryan. It is the second collaboration between Washington and director Zwick. The film was released in the United States on July 12, 1996, to positive reviews and grossed $100 million worldwide.

Plot
While serving in the Gulf War, Lieutenant Colonel Serling accidentally destroys one of his own tanks during a confusing nighttime battle, killing his friend, Captain Boylar. The United States Army covers up the details and transfers Serling to a desk job.

Later, Serling is assigned to determine if Captain Karen Emma Walden should be the first woman to receive (posthumously) the Medal of Honor. She was the commander of a Medevac Huey helicopter sent to rescue the crew of a shot-down Black Hawk helicopter. When Walden encountered a T-54 enemy tank, her crew destroyed it by dropping a fuel bladder onto the tank and igniting it with a flare gun. However, her own helicopter was shot down soon after. The two crews were unable to join forces, and when the survivors were rescued the next day, Walden was reported dead.

Serling notices inconsistencies among the testimonies of Walden's crew. Specialist Andrew Ilario, the medic, praises Walden strongly. However, Staff Sergeant John Monfriez claims that Walden was a coward and that he led the crew in combat and improvised the fuel bladder weapon. Sergeant Altameyer, who is dying in a hospital, complains about a fire. Warrant Officer One Rady, the co-pilot, was injured early on and unconscious throughout. Furthermore, the crew of the Black Hawk claim that they heard firing from an M16, but Ilario and Monfriez claim it was out of ammo.

Serling is under pressure from the White House and his commander, Brigadier General Hershberg, to wrap things up quickly. To prevent another cover-up, Serling leaks the story to newspaper reporter Tony Gartner. When Serling grills Monfriez during a car ride, Monfriez forces him to get out of the vehicle at gunpoint, then commits suicide by driving into an oncoming train.

Serling tracks Ilario down, and Ilario finally tells him the truth. Monfriez wanted to flee, which would mean abandoning Rady. When Walden refused, he pulled a gun on her. Walden then shot an enemy who suddenly appeared behind Monfriez, but Monfriez thought Walden was firing at him and shot her in the stomach, before backing off. The next morning, the enemy attacked again as a rescue party approached. Walden covered her men's retreat, firing an M16. However, Monfriez told the rescuers that Walden was dead, so they left without her. Napalm was then dropped on the entire area. Altameyer tried to expose Monfriez's lie at the time, but was too injured to speak, and Ilario remained silent, scared of the court-martial Monfriez had threatened them with.

Serling presents his final report to Hershberg. Walden's young daughter receives the Medal of Honor at a White House ceremony. Later, Serling tells the truth to the Boylars about the manner of their son's death and says he cannot ask for forgiveness. The Boylars forgive him and tell him he must release his burden at some point.

In the last moments, Serling has a flashback of when he was standing by Boylar's destroyed tank and a medevac Huey was lifting off with his friend's body. Serling suddenly realizes Walden was the pilot.

Cast 

Denzel Washington as Lieutenant Colonel Nathaniel Serling
Meg Ryan as Captain Karen Emma Walden
Lou Diamond Phillips as Staff Sergeant John Monfriez
Matt Damon as Specialist Andrew Ilario
Bronson Pinchot as Bruno, a White House aide
Seth Gilliam as Sergeant Steven Altameyer
Regina Taylor as Meredith Serling
Michael Moriarty as Brigadier General Hershberg
Željko Ivanek as Captain Ben Banacek
Scott Glenn as Tony Gartner, a Washington Post reporter and Vietnam veteran
Tim Guinee as Warrant Officer One A. Rady
Tim Ransom as Captain Boylar
Sean Astin	as Sergeant Patella
Ned Vaughn as First Lieutenant Chelli
Sean Patrick Thomas as Sergeant Thompson
Manny Pérez as Jenkins
Ken Jenkins as Joel Walden
Kathleen Widdoes as Geraldine Walden
Christina Stojanovich as Anne Marie Walden
Tom Schanley as Questioner
Korey Coleman as Radio operator
David McSwain as Sergeant Egan

Reception

Box office
U.S. domestic gross: US$ 59,031,057 
International: $41,829,761
Worldwide gross: $100,860,818

The film opened #3 at the box office behind Independence Day and Phenomenon.

Critical response

The film received mostly positive reviews. As of June 15, 2022, the review aggregator website Rotten Tomatoes reported that 86% of critics gave the film a positive review based upon a sample of 56 reviews with an average rating of 7.3/10. The critical consensus states that the film is "an emotional and intriguing tale of a military officer who must review the merits of a fallen officer while confronting his own war demons. Effectively depicts the terrors of war as well as its heartbreaking aftermath." At the website Metacritic, which uses a weighted average rating system, the film earned a generally favorable rating of 77/100 based on 19 mainstream critic reviews.

The movie was commended by several critics. James Berardinelli of the website ReelViews wrote that the film was, "As profound and intelligent as it is moving, and that makes this memorable motion picture one of 1996's best." Roger Ebert of the Chicago Sun-Times spoke positively of the film saying that while the ending "lays on the emotion a little heavily" the movie had been up until that point "a fascinating emotional and logistical puzzle—almost a courtroom movie, with the desert as the courtroom."

Denzel Washington's acting was specifically lauded, as Peter Travers of Rolling Stone wrote, "In Washington's haunted eyes, in the stunning cinematography of Roger Deakins (Fargo) that plunges into the mad flare of combat, in the plot that deftly turns a whodunit into a meditation on character and in Zwick's persistent questioning of authority, Courage Under Fire honors its subject and its audience." Additionally Peter Stack of the San Francisco Chronicle wrote that "Denzel Washington is riveting."

Accolades
Denzel Washington was nominated for Best Actor at the 1996 Chicago Film Critics Association Awards, but lost to Billy Bob Thornton in Sling Blade.

Historical context
The Medal of Honor was awarded to Mary Edwards Walker, an American Civil War physician, but not for valor in combat.  Walker's award was revoked in 1917, then restored in 1977.

References

External links

Boxoffice information

1996 films
1990s action films
1990s war films
1990s action drama films
American political drama films
American war films
1990s English-language films
Films about armoured warfare
Films directed by Edward Zwick
Films produced by John Davis
Films scored by James Horner
Films set in Iraq
Films set in the United States
Films shot in Connecticut
Films shot in El Paso, Texas
Gulf War films
20th Century Fox films
Davis Entertainment films
Films about the United States Army
1990s political drama films
1996 drama films
1990s American films